"I Choose You" is a song by American singer Keyshia Cole released for her fifth studio album, Woman to Woman (2012) as the album's third and final single. Written by Cole, Jack Splash, Elijah Blake, and Lundon Knighten, with production being handled by Splash, the song was sent to US urban contemporary radio stations as the album's third and final single on August 23, 2013 through Geffen Records and Interscope Records. A sentimental ballad, its lyrics revolve around Cole being caught in a love triangle and struggling to choose which man she wants.

Critical response to "I Choose You" from music journalism was positive, many of whom applauded Cole's vocal performance and the song's concept. It reached number 18 on the official US Adult R&B Songs chart. To promote the song, a music video premiered through 106 & Park on October 2, 2013. The video displays a story of Cole being in love with two men and struggling to choose the one whom she ultimately wants to be with.

Background and composition

"I Choose You" was written by Cole, Jack Splash, Elijah Blake, Lundon Knighten, while it was produced by Splash. Elijah Blake co-wrote the song along with several other songs on Woman to Woman and has described his close friendship with Cole as a "brother/sister type" relationship. The vocals were produced by Kuk Harrell and recorded by Splash, with additional assistance from Josh Gudwin. The track was mixed by Jaycen Joshua, with assistance from Trehy Harris at Larrabee Sound Studios, and mastered by Chris Gehringer. It was presented to both Mary J. Blige and Jennifer Hudson before reaching Cole. During her appearance on BET's 106 & Park, Cole said: "Mary sung it before I did and Jennifer Hudson sung it before I did as well and neither one of them took it. When I recorded it, we definitely paid for it right away. We was like, 'Nobody else is recording this song. We're taking it.'"

Musically, "I Choose You" is a sentimental ballad that lasts four minutes and 49 seconds. The song's lyrics revolve around how Cole is forced to choose between two men that she is madly in love with. The chorus includes Cole singing: "And if it ain’t you / then it's just not worth it." Other lyrics include: "I tried hating you, but I just love you more / compared him to you, but he can't match your score". Melody Charles of SoulTracks implied that in the song, "she toggles between two loves before breaking down why one has heart over the other". Peneliope Richards of Singersroom interpreted that the song makes listeners understand that Cole was able to make that "grappling" decision.

Release and reception 
On August 23, 2013, "I Choose You" was released to US urban contemporary radio stations as the third single from Woman to Woman; it was put forth as a single following her previous releases, "Enough of No Love" and "Trust and Believe" in 2012. In the summer of 2012, the song was debated as the second single, opposed to the latter. Cole has cited "I Choose You" as one of her favorites from Woman to Woman. Upon its release, "I Choose You" was met with positive reviews from music journalism. Ken Capobianco of The Boston Globe suggested the song's main concept as "making choices while staring down tough truths", and a writer from Jet identified it as the strongest track from the album. John Ricard of BET viewed "I Choose You" as a "slow song about an ex-flame" and praised Cole's "strong" vocals. Keithan Samuels of Rated R&B compared Cole's vocals on the song to her vocals on her 2006 single "Love" picked it as a standout track on the album. On November 2, 2013, "I Choose You" peaked at number 18 on the US Billboard Adult R&B Songs chart and remained on the chart for a total of 18 weeks.

Music video
 
The music video for "I Choose You" was filmed during August 2013 in Los Angeles, California. On October 2, 2013, Cole made a guest appearance on BET's 106 & Park and provided an exclusive premiere of the video. The video was made available on other digital platforms later that day. Prior to its release, Cole had posted a photo of herself while filming the music video, which featured her wearing the shoes from her Steve Madden collection.

In the black-and-white video directed by Ethan Lader, a story is displayed of Cole being in love with two men and struggling to choose the one whom she ultimately wants to be with. Cole is seen wearing a "lovely laced" bikini and a "Versace-inspired" outfit while singing in an intimate setting and she is also shown wearing an origami dress designed by Bishme Cromartie as she sings to the two men separately. The singer's hairstyle and looks were compared to the likes of fellow R&B singer K. Michelle. Derrick Taylor of Essence declared the two men in the video as "hunks", interpreting one as being "more clean cut" and the other being "more urban in style".

Credits and personnel 
Credits adapted from the liner notes from Woman to Woman:

Recording and management
 Recorded at Jack's Jumpoff (Miami, Florida)
 Recorded at Platinum Sound (New York City, New York)

Personnel

 Keyshia Cole – lyricist
 Jack Splash – production, lyricist, recording
 Roger Ubina – production
 Nicole Acacio – production
 Elijah Blake – lyricist
 Lundon Knighten – lyricist
 Kuk Harrell – vocal production

 Chris O'Ryan – recording
 Josh Gudwin – recording
 Jaycen Joshua – mixing
 Trehy Harris – mixing assistantance
 Maddox Chhim – mixing assistantance
 Ryan Kaul – mixing assistantance
 Chris Gehringer – mastering

Charts

References

External links
 

Keyshia Cole songs
2010s ballads
2013 singles
2012 songs
Contemporary R&B ballads
Geffen Records singles
Songs written by Jack Splash
Songs written by Keyshia Cole
Songs written by Elijah Blake